Better Late Than Never is a 1983 British comedy film directed by Bryan Forbes and starring David Niven, Art Carney and Maggie Smith. The soundtrack features songs by Henry Mancini and Noël Coward.

Plot
Nick (Niven) is the supposed grandfather of 10-year-old Bridget (Partridge), who stands to inherit a sizeable fortune. Charley (Carney) shows up and claims that he is the genuine grandpa. Both men once slept with Bridget's grandmother, and she was never certain which of the two produced her child. Neither Nick nor Charley are good prospects, so Bridget must choose from the lesser of two evils.

Principal cast

Production
Forbes originally offered Carney's role to William Holden who declined because the fee offered was too small. Forbes wrote in 1992 that if Holden had made the film he "might have been alive today."

References

External links 

1983 films
1983 comedy films
1980s English-language films
Films shot in France
Warner Bros. films
Films directed by Bryan Forbes
Films scored by Henry Mancini